Tayfur Aliyev (born 1 January 1997) is an Azerbaijani boxer. He competed in the men's featherweight event at the 2020 Summer Olympics.

References

External links
 

1997 births
Living people
Azerbaijani male boxers
Olympic boxers of Azerbaijan
Boxers at the 2020 Summer Olympics
People from Nakhchivan
European Games bronze medalists for Azerbaijan
European Games medalists in boxing
Boxers at the 2015 European Games
Boxers at the 2019 European Games
21st-century Azerbaijani people